Andrew Hanson Jones (born 28 November 1963) is a British Conservative Party politician who has been the Member of Parliament (MP) for the Harrogate and Knaresborough constituency in North Yorkshire since 2010. He has twice served as Parliamentary Under-Secretary of State at the Department for Transport and as well as Exchequer Secretary to the Treasury. He returned to the backbenches in July 2019.

Early life 
Born in Ilkley, West Riding of Yorkshire, Jones was educated at the independent Bradford Grammar School and the University of Leeds.

Jones worked for 25 years in various sales and marketing roles before becoming an MP. He chaired Conservative think-tank the Bow Group from 1999 to 2000.

He became a member of Harrogate Borough Council for the High Harrogate ward in 2003. In 2007, he gained more than half of the votes in his ward. He became Cabinet Member for Finance and Resources on the council.

Jones is a passionate cricket fan and has been a member of Yorkshire County Cricket Club for over twenty years.

Member of Parliament 
On 6 May 2010, Jones was elected MP for Harrogate and Knaresborough ending 13 years of Liberal Democrat control. He secured this with a 9.1% swing. Jones had previously unsuccessfully contested the seat in 2001.

Jones made his maiden speech in the House of Commons on 22 June 2010.

He served as the Parliamentary Private Secretary (PPS) to Transport Secretary Justine Greening, and then to Chief Whip Andrew Mitchell.  He was subsequently appointed as a Government Apprenticeship Ambassador and PPS to Jeremy Hunt, Secretary of State for Health. He joined the Regulatory Reform Select Committee in 2010.

Jones campaigned to remain in the European Union during the 2016 European Union referendum.

On 8 January 2018, Jones was reshuffled from Exchequer Secretary to the Treasury to Vice Chair for Business Engagement within the Conservative Party HQ.

On 12 November 2018, Jones was reappointed to the Department for Transport to replace Jo Johnson MP as Parliamentary Under Secretary of State, a position he last held in 2017. He was removed from this role in July 2019, and currently has no ministerial responsibilities.

References

External links 

1963 births
Living people
People educated at Bradford Grammar School
Alumni of the University of Leeds
Conservative Party (UK) MPs for English constituencies
Members of the Bow Group
UK MPs 2010–2015
UK MPs 2015–2017
UK MPs 2017–2019
UK MPs 2019–present